"Crucified" is a song recorded by Swedish duo Bella & Filippa. The song was released as a digital download in Sweden on 26 February 2017 and peaked at number 47 on the Swedish Singles Chart. It took part in Melodifestivalen 2017, and placed fifth the third semi-final on 18 February 2017. It was written by Peter Hägerås, Mats Frisell, Jakob Stadell, Filippa Frisell, and Isabella Snihs.

Track listing

Chart performance

Release history

References

2017 singles
2016 songs
English-language Swedish songs
Melodifestivalen songs of 2017
Swedish pop songs
Warner Music Group singles